IC 289 is a planetary nebula in the constellation Cassiopeia. It was discovered by Lewis Swift in early September 1888. It lies close to the 10th magnitude star BD +60° 0631. N.J. Martin described IC 289 as "A nice, faint round planet like planetary nebula. The uniform oval disc shows some irregularity in brightness but is not obviously brighter at the edge."

The central star of the planetary nebula is an O-type star with a spectral type of O(H).

References

External links
 
 http://www.noao.edu/outreach/aop/observers/ic289.html 

Planetary nebulae
0289
Cassiopeia (constellation)